is a city located in Saitama Prefecture, Japan.

Geography

Surrounding municipalities
Saitama Prefecture
 Kuki
 Sugito
Chiba Prefecture
 Noda
Ibaraki Prefecture
 Goka

Climate
Satte has a humid subtropical climate (Köppen Cfa) characterized by warm summers and cool winters with light to no snowfall.

Demographics
Per Japanese census data, the population of Satte peaked around the year 2000 and has declined since.

History
During the Kamakura period, Satte developed as a post town on the Kamakura Kaidō, and maintained that role through the Edo period with the Nikkō Kaidō and the Nikkō Onari Kaidō.

The town of Satte was created within Kitakatsushika District, Saitama with the establishment of the modern municipalities system on April 1, 1889. It was raised to city status on October 1, 1986.

Government
Satte has a mayor-council form of government with a directly elected mayor and a unicameral city council of 15 members. Satte, together with the town of Sugito, contributes one member to the Saitama Prefectural Assembly. In terms of national politics, the city is part of Saitama 14th district of the lower house of the Diet of Japan.

Economy
The economy of Satte is primarily agricultural.

Education
Japan University of Health Sciences
Satte has nine public elementary schools and three public middle schools operated by the city government, and one public high school operated by the Saitama Prefectural Board of Education.

Transportation

Railway
 Tōbu Railway - Tobu Nikkō Line

Highway

Local attractions
Gongendo Tsutsumi. About 1,000 Yoshino cherry trees are spread out over 1 km along the top of the levee of the Gongendo river. During cherry blossom season, many visitors from all over the prefecture and beyond come to enjoy the picturesque pink and yellow of cherry and rapeseed blossoms, and vendors set up stalls. The levee is also sown with hydrangea and red spider lilies, which bloom in the summer and fall.

Notable people from Satte
Kagami Yoshimizu, the creator of the Lucky Star series, was born in Satte. Although he has now moved out of Satte, his house was turned into the Lucky Star Museum, made to resemble Konata Izumi's (one of the main characters in the series) house for a few years. The museum is now closed.

References

External links

Official Website 

Cities in Saitama Prefecture